Macrobrachium lamarrei commonly known as the Indian whisker shrimp, kuncho river prawn is a nocturnal species of freshwater shrimp found Biratnagar, Nepal. ''

Description
M. lamarrei is creamy white to light brownish white with greenish brown pigmentation all over the cephalothorax. The  males can reach a total length of 80 mm while the females are 75 mm long. This species has rostrum bears 7-9 teeth dorsally and 5-8 ventrally.

Juvenile and adult prawns are omnivorous and feed on algae, planktonic organisms, small muscle pieces of their own kind or fish. Post larvae prawns feed on pure animal diet than on mixed diet of algae and nauplii.

Behavior
Prawns of different sizes do not attack each other. When prawns die or become weak, others may attack and make them into their meal.

References

Palaemonidae
Freshwater crustaceans of Asia
Crustaceans described in 1837